A by-election was held for the New South Wales Legislative Assembly electorate of Neutral Bay on 2 June 1951 because of the resignation of Ivan Black. Black wanted to contest the federal seat of Warringah as the Liberal candidate at the 1951 Australian federal election. He understood that he had to resign from the state parliament at least 14 days prior to the close of nominations, which meant he needed to resign before the Liberal party selected its candidate. He was defeated for pre-selection by Francis Bland, who went on to comfortably win the seat. Black was selected as the Liberal candidate to retain the state seat.

Dates

Result

See also
Electoral results for the district of Neutral Bay
List of New South Wales state by-elections

References

1951 elections in Australia
New South Wales state by-elections
1950s in New South Wales